The Zafarnama is a panegyric book written by Sharaf al-Din Ali Yazdi approximately two decades after the death of its main subject, Timur, the Turco-Mongol conqueror. It was commissioned by Ibrahim Sultan, Timur's grandson between 1424–28, and remains one of the best-known sources of Timur's life. The text was written using the notes taken by royal scribes and secretaries of Timur, suggesting that the history of the book was based on a careful and desired selection of facts. 

Most of the poetry and texts in the beginning of Islamic Iran were panegyric, written at the demand of political and religious leaders as part of their attempt to establish their own legacy. In his lifetime, Timur wished that his deeds would be commemorated through clear and simple language. However, the Zafarnama has a decent amount of hyperbolic language and panegyric sentiment, revealing that the current literary tastes of the next generation of writers prevailed over Timur's wishes. The Zafarnama was often copied and illustrated in Persia before making its way to being translated into Chagatai under the Uzbeks, and into Ottoman Turkish during the 16th century. More recently, the Zafarnama was translated into French in 1722 by François Pétis de la Croix and into English the following year.

The Zafarnama of Yazdi is one of several fifteenth-century texts that highlights Timur's leadership and military accomplishments. Sharaf al-Din Ali Yazdi relied on these previous texts about Timur's career as a conqueror to influence his text of the Zafarnama. One of his main influences was a biography written by Nizam al-Din Shami in 1404. An example of proof of this statement is the use of Ghiyas al-Din Ali's story detailing Timur’s experience in India (the Ruz-Name-ye Ghazavat-e Hindustan) that is present in both versions of the Zafarnama that are decades apart. In 1410, one of Timur's sons, Shah Rukh, demanded an updated version of his father's history. By then, the original Zafarnamas author, Nizam al-Din Shami, had died so another scribe, Taj al-Salmani, finished the manuscript and put Timur's last few years onto paper. These textual precedents were important to the creation of the Zafarnama of Sultan Husayn, as they dictated the content of the text in the manuscript.

Author
Sharaf al-Din Ali Yazdi, also known by his pen name Sharaf, was a 15th-century scholar who authored several works in the arts and sciences, including mathematics, astronomy, enigma, literature such as poetry, and history, the Zafarnama being his most famous (539). He was born in the affluent city of Yazd, Iran in the 1370s. He devoted much of his life to scholarship, furthering his education in Syria and Egypt until Timur’s death in 1405 (1,19). Sharaf al-Din rebelled against ruler Shah Rukh in 1446–47 when the government was vulnerable, but was later commissioned to different cities for his acumen. The later years of his life were spent in Taft, where he eventually died in 1454 (Monfared 539). 

Yazdi was directed to write a biography of Timur in 1421 known as the Zafarnama, completing it four years later in 1425. Timur’s grandson Sultan Abu al-Fath Ibrahim Mirza was patron during the completion of his father’s biography (Monfared 539).

Manuscripts
Several illustrated manuscript versions of the Zafarnama exist; however, out of the versions written in the fifteenth century, only three illustrated copies survive, the Zafarnama of Ibrahim Sultan, the Garrett Zafarnama, and the Turk ve Islam Eserleri Müzesi Zafarnama. The variety of versions of the Zafarnama can be attributed to the wide variety of patrons who commissioned the production of this manuscript. Each patron had different personal tastes and goals for their version of the Zafarnama, which influenced the choices of illustrations and design executed by the artists of their choosing.

The Garrett Zafarnama (or Baltimore Zafarnama or Zafarnama of Sultan Husayn Mirza) is an early manuscript of the Zafarnama (Book of Victories) by Sharaf al-Din Ali Yazdi now in the Johns Hopkins University Library in Baltimore, Maryland, USA. The manuscript has twelve Persian miniatures, in six double-page spreads, and was made around 1467–8, possibly in Herat. The colophon states that the manuscript was the work of "the most humble Shir Ali," who was a popular scribe in his day. It is believed that the six illustrations were painted by the renowned artist, Kamāl ud-Dīn Behzād.

A version was produced in the workshop of the Mughal Emperor Akbar in the 1590s.

1436 edition (Ibrahim Sultan's copy)
This is the original edition, ordered by Ibrahim Sultan, Timur's grandson, and completed in 1436.

1467 edition (Garrett Zafarnama)

1485 edition (Herat, Afghanistan)

1595-1600 edition (Akbar's copy)
This is Akbar's copy, completed between 1595 and 1600.

Other editions

References

Iranian books
Timurid dynasty
15th-century history books
Timur
Biographies (books)
History books about India
Historiography of India
Indian manuscripts
Persian-language books
Panegyrics